= Jacques Brodeur =

Canadian biologist

- Scientific career
- Fields: Biology
- Institutions: Université de Montréal; Université Laval

Jacques Brodeur is a Canadian biologist, currently a Canada Research Chair in Biocontrol at Université de Montréal.
